Loxostege ziczac is a moth in the family Crambidae. It was described by Sauber in 1899. It is found in Central Asia.

References

Moths described in 1899
Pyraustinae